Nationality words link to articles with information on the nation's poetry or literature (for instance, Irish or France).

Events

Works published
 Elizabeth Bradford and William Bradford write prefatory poems for Benjamin Keach's War with the Devil, Colonial America
 Samuel Cobb, Poems on Several Occasions
 Benjamin Colman, "A Poem on Elijah's Translation, occasioned by the death of Rev. Samuel Willard", delivered as a sermon at Willard's funeral, the longest of Colman's poems; English Colonial America
 Poems on Affairs of State, including the first publication together of Shakespeare's Venus and Adonis and The Rape of Lucrece
 John Pomfret, Quae Rara, Chara: A poem on Panthea's confinement
 Charles Sedley, The Poetical Works
 Nahum Tate, The Triumph of Union
 Isaac Watts, Hymns and Spiritual Songs, the first of many editions throughout the 18th century and afterward
 John Wilmot, Earl of Rochester, The Miscellaneous Works of the Right Honourable the Late Earls of Rochester And Roscommon. With The Memoirs of the Life and Character of the late Earl of Rochester, in a Letter to the Dutchess of Mazarine. By Mons. St. Evremont, London: Printed & sold by B. Bragge; second edition in the same year, London: Printed for Edmund Curll (third edition, 1709)

Births
Death years link to the corresponding "[year] in poetry" article:
 March 26 – Mather Byles, (died 1788), English Colonial American clergyman and poet
 December 18 – Charles Wesley (died 1788), English Methodist clergyman and hymn writer

Deaths
Birth years link to the corresponding "[year] in poetry" article:
 March 30 – Henry Hall (born 1656), English poet and composer of church music
 September 15 – George Stepney (born 1663), English poet and diplomat
 September 18 – Petter Dass (born c.1647/8), Norwegian poet
 September 23 – John Tutchin (born c. 1661), English radical Whig controversialist, gadfly journalist and poet
 September 24 – Vincenzo da Filicaja (born 1642), Italian poet
 Also:
 Takarai Kikaku 宝井其角, also known as "Enomoto Kikaku" (born 1661), Japanese haiku poet and disciple of Matsuo Bashō
 Wali Mohammed Wali, also known as Wali Deccani and Wali Aurangabadi (born 1667), Indian, Urdu-language poet

See also

Poetry
List of years in poetry
List of years in literature

Notes

 "A Timeline of English Poetry" Web page of the Representative Poetry Online Web site, University of Toronto

18th-century poetry
Poetry